Delta Horologii (δ Horologii) is a binary star system in the constellation Horologium. It is visible to the naked eye with a combined apparent visual magnitude of 4.93. As of 2014, the pair had an angular separation of 0.20 arc seconds along a position angle of 24°. Based upon an annual parallax shift of 18.24 mas as seen from Earth, it is located 179 ± 4 light years from the Sun.

The primary, component A, is a magnitude 5.15 A-type main sequence star with a stellar classification of A9 V. At the estimated age of 768 million years, it is spinning rapidly with a projected rotational velocity of 220 km/s, giving the star an oblate shape with an equatorial bulge that is 15% larger than the polar radius. The star has 1.4 times the mass of the Sun.

The secondary has an apparent magnitude of 7.29.

References

A-type main-sequence stars
Horologium (constellation)
Horologii, Delta
1302
026612
019515
Durchmusterung objects
Binary stars